The term royal city denotes a privilege that some cities in Bohemia and Moravia enjoyed during the Middle Ages. It meant the city was an inalienable part of the royal estate; the king could not sell or pledge the city. At the beginning of the 16th century, about 40 cities enjoyed this privilege. The citizens of these cities had a higher position in the estates of the realm than any other subjects.

A similar status was dowry town; these were a source of income for the Queen. These cities had a duty of socage. Originally, this meant that each citizen had to work the kings land a certain number of days each year, but this was soon replaced by a cash payment.

Citizens of the royal cities
Citizens of the royal cities had a special social status. It took a legal deed to become citizen. If the applicant purchased a home, or lived in the city for a long time, or could prove "good" ancestry and a decent family life and, if he had been a subject, could show a release certificate, then the applicant had a chance to be admitted to this privileged class. There were other ways to obtain this status: one could purchase it, or marry into it. Sometimes a city would offer citizenship, especially to educated inhabitants.

The precise rights and duties of the citizens differed considerably from city to city. They depended on the status of the city. Even among the citizens, there was a hierarchy, which was reflected in income, the order at the Last Supper and the seat in the church, but also at the location of the house.

Royal cities in Bohemia and Moravia
Czech name, German name, and year of appointment:

Uničov (Mährisch Neustadt) 1213
Bruntál (Freudenthal) 1223
Opava (Troppau) vor 1224
Hradec Králové (Königgrätz) 1225
Znojmo (Znaim) 1226
Jemnice (Jamnitz) etwa 1227
Hodonín (Göding) etwa 1228
Litoměřice (Leitmeritz) 1228–1230
Bzenec (Bisenz) 1231
Staré Město (Prager Altstadt) 1235–1245
Brno (Brünn) 1238, 1240
Stříbro (Mies) 1240
Loket (Elbogen) 1240–1253
Žatec (Saaz) 1265
Přerov (Prerau) 1252
Olomouc (Ölmütz) 1253
Jihlava (Iglau) 1253
Písek (Pisek) 1256
Kolín (Kolin, also known as Cologne on the Elbe) 1253–1261
Kouřim (Gurim, older: Kaurzim) 1253–1261
Tachov (Tachau) 1253–1278
Most (Brüx) before 1257
Uherské Hradiště (Ungarisch Hradisch) 1257
Čáslav (Tschaslau) c. 1260
Chrudim (–) c. 1260
Klatovy (Klattau) before 1260
Vysoké Mýto (Hohenmauth) c. 1260
Ústí nad Labem (Aussig) c. 1260
Louny (Laun) after 1260
Kadaň (Kaaden) before 1261
Domažlice (Taus) c. 1262
České Budějovice (Böhmisch Budweis) 1265
Polička (Politschka) 1265
Chotěboř (Chotieborsch) 1265–1278
Ostrov nad Ohří (Schlackenwerth) 1269
Litovel (Littau) 1270
Uherský Brod (Ungarisch Brod) 1272
Sušice (Schüttenhofen) 1273?
Nymburk (Nimburg, also known as Neuenburg on the Elbe) 1276
Dvůr Králové (Königinhof on the Elbe) 1253–1278 and after 1399
Jaroměř (Jermer) 1253–1278
Mělník (Melnik) 1253–1274
Kutná Hora (Kuttenberg) vor 1276
Plzeň (Pilsen) 1295
Nový Bydžov (Neubidschow) 1305–1325
Vodňany (Wodnian) 1337
Pražské Nové Město (Prager Neustadt) 1348
Karlovy Vary (Karlsbad) 1370
Trutnov (Trautenau) 1399
Nový Knín (Neuknin) 1437
Velvary (Welwarn) 1482
Kyjov (Gaya) 1548
Beroun (Beraun)
Slaný (Schlan)
Hlivice (Gleiwitz)
Ivančice (Eibenschütz)
Kozlí (Cosel)
Opolí (Oppeln)
Pohořelice (Pohrlitz)
Prudník (Neustadt)
Ratiboř (Ratibor)
Žárov (Sohrau)

External links
Website of dowry towns 

History of Europe